Phoenix Players is the largest and oldest repertory theatre company in East and Central Africa. Situated in Nairobi, Kenya it was registered in 1983 as a non-profit making company limited by guarantee. Phoenix Players mount, on average, a new play every three weeks throughout the year. Their 120-seat auditorium is located in the Professional Centre on Parliament Road.

References
The EastAfrican, February 26, 2007: Death of Kenyan theatre's 'grandfather'

External links
Official website

Nairobi
Theatre in Kenya
Theatre companies in Kenya